Ian Davenport is an English producer, engineer and mixer based at Courtyard Studio in Oxfordshire. Davenport is notable for his work for Radiohead's Philip Selway, Supergrass, Gaz Coombes and Band Of Skulls.

Associated awards

Discography

References

English record producers
1966 births
Living people